Defund is a Canadian short drama film, directed by Khadijah Roberts-Abdullah and Araya Mengesha and released in 2021. The film stars Roberts-Abdullah and Mengesha as a sister and brother who have been in isolation in Toronto during the COVID-19 pandemic, and must confront the complexities of political activism when they are motivated to get out into the streets during the Black Lives Matter protests of 2020.

The film's cast also includes Karen Robinson, Vivien Endicott-Douglas, Getenesh Berhe, Nickeshia Garrick, Richard Lam and Anand Rajaram.

The film premiered at the 2021 Toronto International Film Festival, and was subsequently screened at the 2021 Vancouver International Film Festival.

The film was named to TIFF's annual year-end Canada's Top Ten list for 2021.

References

External links
 

2021 films
2021 short films
Canadian drama short films
Black Canadian films
Films shot in Toronto
Films set in Toronto
2020s English-language films
2020s Canadian films